Anna Dereszowska (born 7 January 1981) is a Polish actress and singer. She studied at The Aleksander Zelwerowicz National Academy of Dramatic Art in Warsaw.

Discography
 Już Nie Zapomnisz Mnie (2011)

Filmography 
 2012: Siła wyższa as Siostra Dorota
 2011: Na dobre i na złe  as Magda Soszyńska
 2011: Miłość w sieci
 2010: Sprawiedliwi as Ina Paloma
 2010: Klub szalonych dziewic as Magda Mazurek
 2010: Randka w ciemno as Kinga
 2009: Nowa as Karina Sznajder
 2009: Nigdy nie mów nigdy as Ama Bilska
 2009: M jak miłość as Sandra Matuszewska
 2009: Naznaczony as Milena Kral
 2009: Tylko miłość as Karolina
 2008: Hardcover as Ewa
 2008: Lejdis as Korba
 2007: Odwróceni as Laura
 2007: Tajemnica twierdzy szyfrów as Anna Maria Solof
 2007: Świadek koronny as Laura
 2007: Testosteron
 2005: Tango z aniołem as Wiktoria Adasiewicz
 2003: Zróbmy sobie wnuka as Basia
 2002: Złotopolscy as Kalina Fatalska

Polish dubbing 

 2017   Syberia 3 - Kate Walker    
 2011: Delfin Plum – manta ray "Oceania"
 2011: LittleBigPlanet 2 – Eva
 2011: Beverly Hills Chihuahua 2 (pol. Cziłała z Beverly Hills 2) – Rachel
 2010: Camp Rock 2 – Connie Torres
 2010: Cats & Dogs: The Revenge of Kitty Galore (pol. Psy i koty: Odwet Kitty) – Catherine
 2010: Lilly the Witch: The Dragon and the Magic Book (pol. Czarodziejka Lili: Smok i magiczna księga) – Mother
 2010: I'm in the Band (pol. Ja w kapeli) – Beth
 2010: Nanny McPhee and the Big Bang (pol. Niania i wielkie bum) – Ms Green
 2010: Alice in Wonderland (Alicja w Krainie Czarów)
 2009: The Flight Before Christmas (pol. Renifer Niko ratuje święta) – Wilma
 2009: A Christmas Carol (pol. Opowieść wigilijna) – Belle
 2009: The Courageous Heart of Irena Sendler (pol. Dzieci Ireny Sendlerowej) – Ewa
 2008: The Garfield Show (pol. Garfield) – Liz
 2008: Bedtime Stories (pol. Opowieści na dobranoc) − Jill
 2008: The Suite Life on Deck (pol. Suite Life: Nie ma to jak statek) – Carey Martin
 2008: Beverly Hills Chihuahua (pol. Cziłała z Beverly Hills) − Rachel
 2008: Camp Rock − Connie Torres
 2007: The Last Wish (book) (pol. Ostatnie życzenie) 
 2007: Enchanted (pol. Zaczarowana) − Nancy
 2007: The Golden Compass (pol. Złoty kompas) − Serafina Pekkala
 2007: Happily N'Ever After (pol. Happy Wkręt) − Sister
 2005: The Chronicles of Narnia: The Lion, the Witch and the Wardrobe (pol. Opowieści z Narnii: Lew, Czarownica i stara szafa)
 2005: The Suite Life of Zack & Cody (Nie ma to jak hotel) – Carey Martin
 2005: American Dragon Jake Long (pol. Amerykański smok Jake Long) – Rose (season I)
 2004-2006: Justice League Unlimited (pol. Liga Sprawiedliwych Bez Granic)
 2012 The Avengers as Maria Hill

References

Polish film actresses
1981 births
Living people
Polish television actresses
Polish voice actresses
Polish pop singers
21st-century Polish singers
21st-century Polish women singers